Fenny or Fenni may refer to

People
Fenni, ancient people of northeastern Europe
Cymreigyddion y Fenni, Welsh language society
Fenchurch (The Hitchhiker's Guide to the Galaxy), whose brother refers to her as Fenny

Given name
Fenny Heemskerk (1919–2007), Dutch female chess master

Surname
Achour Fenni, poet, translator and academician from Algeria

Places
Fenny Airfield, abandoned U.S. Air Forces airfield in Bangladesh
Fenny Bentley, village in Derbyshire, England
Fenny Castle, remains of a castle in Somerset, England
Fenny Compton, village and parish in Warwickshire, England
Fenny Compton railway station
Fenny Compton West railway station
Fenny Drayton, village in Leicestershire, England
Fenny Stratford, constituent town of Milton Keynes, England
Fenny Stratford railway station

Other
Y Fenni cheese, Welsh cheese 
Feni (liquor), distilled liquor from cashew apples
Fentanyl, street name

See also
Feni (disambiguation)